The D.C. United Hall of Tradition (formerly Tradition of Excellence) is an honor bestowed upon players, coaches and club management deemed by the franchise to have crucial to the club's success.

Originally known as Tradition of Excellence, the honor was created in 2003 when the club honored midfielder John Harkes. Since 2007, six fellow players, executives and media partners have been honored by United.

The most recent inductee into the Hall of Tradition was United midfielder and current head coach, Ben Olsen was a member of the club during their late 1998 and 2009 dynasty, which included two MLS Cup honors, three MLS Supporter's Shields, a U.S. Open Cup and a CONCACAF title.

Induction ceremony 
On September 13, 2008, at halftime during a match against FC Dallas, D.C. United honored the 1998 squad that won the CONCACAF Champions' Cup including the two finalists for induction into the Hall; Richie Williams and Jeff Agoos. Agoos was inducted during a 2-1 playoff victory against the New England Revolution on December 16, 2008, after winning three MLS Cup titles during five seasons with D.C. United.

Díaz Arce and Dirón became the fourth and fifth inductees during a halftime ceremony while D.C. United faced the Seattle Sounders at RFK Stadium on September 12, 2009. Pope was inducted in the Hall at halftime ceremony during a 2–1 loss against the Los Angeles Galaxy on July 18, 2010.

2011 induction ceremony 
On June 13, 2011, D.C. United announced four nominees for the 2011 Hall of Tradition induction ceremony, including Roy Lassiter, Carlos Llamosa, John Maessner, and Richie Williams. On July 12, 2011, D.C. United announced that defensive midfielder Richie Williams would be inducted into the Hall of Tradition during a match against the Portland Timbers on August 27. Before the induction ceremony D.C. United President and CEO Kevin Payne recognized Williams' accomplishments:

Williams played for D.C. United six of his eight seasons in Major League Soccer. During his first five seasons with the club from 1996 until 2000 Williams helped the team win several titles, including the 1996, 1997, and 1999 MLS Cup titles; the 1996 U.S. Open Cup championship; the 1997 and 1999 Supporters Shields; and the 1998 Champions Cup and InterAmerican Cup victories. Williams played a final additional season with D.C. United in 2002.

2013 induction ceremony 
On September 14, 2013, Jaime Moreno was inducted into the Hall of Tradition at halftime of a match against the Los Angeles Galaxy at RFK Stadium. The ceremony was particularly poignant due to the presence of Galaxy coach Bruce Arena, who coached Moreno at DC United early in his career.

List of members

Members by position 

Players only.

Members by nationality

See also 

 D.C. United
 All-time D.C. United roster
 History of D.C. United
 List of D.C. United managers

References

External links
 Hall of Tradition page (D.C. United official website)
 Eddie Pope Tribute on YouTube
 Richie Williams induction ceremony on YouTube

Tradition
Lists of soccer players by club in the United States
Association football museums and halls of fame
Halls of fame in Washington, D.C.
Sports hall of fame inductees
Awards established in 2003
2003 establishments in Washington, D.C.
Association football player non-biographical articles